The Fate of the Furious: The Album is the soundtrack album to The Fate of the Furious. It was released on April 14, 2017, by Artist Partner Group and Atlantic Records, in conjunction of the film's US theatrical release. It was promoted by six singles: "Go Off", "Hey Ma", "Good Life", "Gang Up", "Horses", and "Candy Paint".

Singles
The first single of the album, "Go Off", was released on March 2, 2017. The song is performed by Lil Uzi Vert, Quavo and Travis Scott. The second single, "Hey Ma", by Pitbull and J Balvin featuring Camila Cabello, was released on March 10. "Good Life" by G-Eazy and Kehlani was released as the third single on March 17. "Gang Up" by Young Thug, 2 Chainz, Wiz Khalifa and PnB Rock was released as the fourth single on March 24. The fifth single, "Horses", by PnB Rock, Kodak Black and A Boogie wit da Hoodie, was released on March 30. The sixth single, "Candy Paint", performed by Post Malone, was released on October 20.

Track listing

Charts

Weekly charts

Year-end charts

Certifications

Awards
 32nd Japan Gold Disc Awards – Soundtrack Album of the Year

References

Fast & Furious albums
2017 soundtrack albums
Atlantic Records soundtracks
Albums produced by Murda Beatz
Albums produced by Jason Evigan
Albums produced by Louis Bell
Action film soundtracks
Electronic dance music albums